Emil G. Gilbertson (September 14, 1870 – November 5, 1949) was an American politician and farmer.

Born in the town of Irving, Jackson County, Wisconsin, Gilbertson went to the Black River Falls High School in Black River Falls, Wisconsin. Gilbertson was a farmer in the town of Irving. He served as the Irving town clerk and was a member of the school board. He also served on the Jackson County Board of Supervisors and was the chairman of the county board. In 1927 and 1929, Gilbertson served in the Wisconsin State Assembly and was a Republican. In 1930, Gilbertson and his wife moved to a house in Black River Falls, Wisconsin. Gilbertson died in a hospital in Black River Falls, Wisconsin.

Notes

1870 births
1949 deaths
People from Jackson County, Wisconsin
Farmers from Wisconsin
County supervisors in Wisconsin
School board members in Wisconsin
Republican Party members of the Wisconsin State Assembly